A base on balls (BB), also known as a walk, occurs in baseball when a batter receives four pitches that the umpire calls balls, and is in turn awarded first base without the possibility of being called out.  The base on balls is defined in Section 2.00 of baseball's Official Rules, and further detail is given in 6.08(a).  It is, however, considered a faux pas for a professional player to actually walk to first base; the batter-runner and any advancing runners normally jog on such a play.

This is a list of top 100 Major League Baseball pitchers who have allowed the most walks of all time. Nolan Ryan holds the record for walking the most batters in a career with 2,795. Ryan is the only pitcher in MLB history to walk more than 2,000 batters.

Key

List

See also
List of Major League Baseball career hit batsmen leaders

References

Baseball-Reference.com

Bases on balls allowed
Walks allowed
Top sports lists